Lofty Fake Anagram is an album by vibraphonist Gary Burton recorded in 1967 and released on the RCA label. It features Burton with guitarist Larry Coryell, bassist Steve Swallow and drummer Bob Moses.

Reception 
The Allmusic review by Scott Yanow awarded the album 4½ stars, stating, "it is the interplay between Burton and the rockish Coryell in this early fusion group (predating Miles Davis' Bitches Brew by two years) that makes this session most notable".

Track listing
All compositions by Gary Burton except as indicated.
 "June the 15, 1967" (Mike Gibbs) - 4:52 
 "Feelings and Things" (Gibbs) - 4:06 
 "Fleurette Africaine" (Duke Ellington) - 3:41 
 "I'm Your Pal" (Steve Swallow) - 3:05 
 "Lines" - 3:13 
 "The Beach" - 3:43 
 "Mother of the Dead Man" (Carla Bley) - 4:59 
 "Good Citizen Swallow" - 5:34 
 "General Mojo Cuts Up" (Swallow) - 4:35 
Recorded at RCA Victor's Music Center Of The World, Hollywood, CA on August 15–17, 1967.

Personnel 
 Gary Burton — vibraphone
 Larry Coryell — guitar 
 Steve Swallow — bass  
 Bob Moses — drums

References 

RCA Records albums
Gary Burton albums
1967 albums